Mount Mar Daniel, is a mountain in Nineveh Plains in northern Iraq. The mountain lies 30km east of Mosul and some 5km north east of Bartella.

Mount Mar Daniel was known for its religious importance in Syriac Christianity since the 4th century when it was continuously inhabited by hermits. The mountain contains a number of hermitages as well as the Mar Daniel monastery which date back to the late 4th century.

See also
Mount Alfaf

References
سهل نينوى, دراسة تاريخية وبلدانية, Karemlash.com

Nineveh Plains
Mar Daniel